A horseshoe cloud is a relatively uncommon meteorological phenomenon which manifests as a cloud in the shape of a horseshoe or inverted letter "U".

They occur when a horseshoe vortex deforms a cumulus cloud. The clouds are relatively short-lived and is the last stage before one dissipates. Horseshoe vortex clouds are a form of "fair-weather" funnel cloud and are similar to the shear funnel type of funnel cloud.

A March 2018 instance was explained by the United States National Weather Service:

These clouds do not occur often because all the needed conditions rarely occur together.

References 

Cloud types